"Kiss You Goodbye" is a song recorded by Swedish singer Anton Hagman. The song was released as a digital download in Sweden on 26 February 2017 and peaked at number 17 on the Swedish Singles Chart. It is taking part in Melodifestivalen 2017, and qualified to andra chansen from the third semi-final on 18 February 2017. The song qualified to the final from andra chansen on 4 March 2017. It was written by Christian Fast, Tim Schou, and Henrik Nordenback.

Track listing

Chart performance

Weekly charts

Release history

References

2017 singles
2016 songs
English-language Swedish songs
Melodifestivalen songs of 2017
Swedish pop songs
Universal Music Group singles